The 1996 Georgia Bulldogs football team represented the University of Georgia during the 1996 NCAA Division I-A football season. The Bulldogs completed the season with a 5–6 record.

Schedule

Roster

References

Georgia
Georgia Bulldogs football seasons
Georgia Bulldogs football